Los hijos de López is a 1980 Argentine film directed by Enrique Dawi.

Cast

External links 
 
 Summary data of this Argentine sitcom (in Spanish)

1980 films
Argentine comedy films
1980s Spanish-language films
Films directed by Enrique Dawi
1980s Argentine films